Mosillus bidentatus is a species of shore flies in the family Ephydridae.

Distribution
Canada, United States.

References

Ephydridae
Insects described in 1926
Diptera of North America
Taxa named by Ezra Townsend Cresson